Teenage Mojo Workout is the second studio album by the Japanese rock band the 5.6.7.8's. It was released in 2002 on the record label Time Bomb.

Track listing

References

The 5.6.7.8's albums
2002 albums